The Glen Bridge is a two lane bridge that carries NY 28 across the Hudson River connecting Johnsburg, New York with Chester, built in 1959.

See also
List of fixed crossings of the Hudson River

References

Bridges over the Hudson River
Bridges completed in 1959
Road bridges in New York (state)
Girder bridges in the United States
Transportation buildings and structures in Warren County, New York
Bridges in Orange County, New York